David Sánchez Rodríguez (born 25 July 1982) is a Spanish former footballer who played as a defensive or attacking midfielder, and is the current manager of Real Murcia's under-17 team.

Club career
A trainee of both Sevilla FC (early) and FC Barcelona (with whom he featured in a UEFA Champions League game, against Club Brugge KV), Sánchez was born in Seville, Andalusia, and he made his debut in La Liga with Albacete Balompié in 2003–04. On 19 October 2003, after a team effort, he scored from a lob in a 3–1 home win over Real Sociedad – his only goal of the season.

Sánchez spent the second half of the 2004–05 campaign in the second division, loaned to Deportivo Alavés, and appeared rarely as the Basques returned to the top flight. He then completed another two solid years with Albacete.

In July 2007, Sánchez moved to Gimnàstic de Tarragona of the second level. Scarcely used, he joined Romanian club FC Timişoara at the end of the season, being loaned to FC Gloria Buzău in January 2009 and being released in July after only 12 total appearances.

After spending the first months of the new campaign training on his own, Sánchez moved in January 2010 to CD Castellón of division two, making no appearances as the Valencian team also suffered relegation. In August, he signed with another side in that tier, Elche CF.

Sánchez left the club at the end of 2010–11, amid rumours that he had sold out to Granada CF during the top division promotion play-offs. Shortly after, he signed for CD Atlético Baleares in the third division.

On 13 July 2013, Sánchez returned to Gimnàstic, now in the third tier of Spanish football. On 23 July of the following year, he moved to UD Melilla in the same division.

Sánchez continued to compete in the lower leagues or amateur football until his retirement at the age of 37, representing in the process Cádiz CF, Atlético Baleares, Real Murcia and Orihuela CF. On 4 July 2019, he was appointed manager of Murcia's under-17 squad as well as part of the club's technical secretariat.

References

External links

1982 births
Living people
Footballers from Seville
Spanish footballers
Association football midfielders
La Liga players
Segunda División players
Segunda División B players
Tercera División players
FC Barcelona C players
FC Barcelona Atlètic players
FC Barcelona players
Albacete Balompié players
Gimnàstic de Tarragona footballers
CD Castellón footballers
Elche CF players
CD Atlético Baleares footballers
UD Melilla footballers
Cádiz CF players
Real Murcia players
Orihuela CF players
Liga I players
FC Politehnica Timișoara players
FC Gloria Buzău players
Spain youth international footballers
Spanish expatriate footballers
Expatriate footballers in Romania
Spanish expatriate sportspeople in Romania